Meads is a district of Eastbourne, East Sussex, England

Meads may also refer to:

 MEADS (Medium Extended Air Defense System)
 Meads (surname)
 Meads, Kentucky, United States
 Meads Bay Pond, Anguilla
 Meads Cup, New Zealand
 Meads Peak, Antarctica

See also
 Mead (disambiguation)
 Meade (disambiguation)
 Meades (disambiguation)
 Medes (disambiguation)